Cheryl Campbell (born 22 May 1949) is an English actor of stage, film and television. She starred opposite Bob Hoskins in the 1978 BBC drama Pennies From Heaven, before going on to win the 1980 BAFTA TV Award for Best Actress for Testament of Youth and Malice Aforethought, and the 1982 Olivier Award for Best Actress in a Revival for A Doll's House. Her film appearances include Chariots of Fire (1981), Greystoke: The Legend of Tarzan, Lord of the Apes (1984) and The Shooting Party (1985).

Early life
Born in St Albans, Hertfordshire, Campbell is the daughter of an airline pilot. She was educated at Francis Bacon Grammar School, St Albans, and at London Academy of Music and Dramatic Art (LAMDA). Her repertory theatre experience includes the Palace Theatre, Watford, Birmingham Rep and the Citizens' Theatre, Glasgow.

Career
Campbell is known for her starring role as Vera Brittain in the BBC's television dramatisation of Testament of Youth (1979), for which she received Best Actress awards from the British Academy Television Award (BAFTA) and the Broadcasting Press Guild Award.

Campbell had earned her first BAFTA nomination the previous year for her portrayal of Eileen Everson opposite Bob Hoskins in Dennis Potter's television serial Pennies from Heaven (1978). Campbell's one other role in a work by Potter was as Janet in Rain on the Roof (1980).

Stage
Campbell is an accomplished stage performer and has twice been a member of the Royal Shakespeare Company. At the RSC in 1982, she played Nora Helmer in Adrian Noble's production of Ibsen's A Doll's House (for which she was awarded the Laurence Olivier Award for Best Actress in a Revival). In that same season, she also appeared as Diana in All's Well That Ends Well.

She returned to the RSC in the 1992–94 season, playing Lady Macbeth to Derek Jacobi's lead in Noble's controversial production of Macbeth; Beatrice-Joanna in The Changeling; Mistress Ford in The Merry Wives of Windsor and Natasha in Misha's Party. She worked at the Royal National Theatre: playing as a junior member of the company in 1975, as Freda in Sir Peter Hall's Old Vic production of John Gabriel Borkman (starring Sir Ralph Richardson, Dame Peggy Ashcroft and Dame Wendy Hiller) and as Maggie in W. S. Gilbert's Engaged; in 1995, as Lady Politic Would-Be in Matthew Warchus's Volpone; and in 2003 as Dotty Otley in the NT's touring (and London) revival of Noises Off.

Campbell's other stage performances in London have encompassed the classics as well as new plays; they include You Never Can Tell (Lyric, 1979); Miss Julie (1983) in the title role; Little Eyolf (1985) as Asta; The Daughter-in-Law (1985) as Minnie; The Sneeze (a Chekhov selection) (1988) in various roles; Betrayal (1991) as Emma; The Strip (1995) as Loretta; Some Sunny Day (1996) as Emily; The Seagull (1997) as Arkadina; Passion (2000) as Nell; and Life After George (2002) as Beatrix.

In provincial theatre, she has appeared in: The Country Wife (Manchester Royal Exchange) as Margery Pinchwife; The Constant Wife (Theatr Clwyd) as Constance; A Streetcar Named Desire (Leicester Haymarket) as Blanche (for which she received a Regional Theatre Best Actress award); and So Long Life (touring production) as Wendy.

Filmography

Film

Television

References

External links

1949 births
Living people
Alumni of the London Academy of Music and Dramatic Art
Best Actress BAFTA Award (television) winners
English stage actresses
English television actresses
English film actresses
People from St Albans
Royal Shakespeare Company members
Actresses from Hertfordshire
Laurence Olivier Award winners